Mount Pleasant Township is a township in Adams County, Pennsylvania,  United States. As of the 2010 census, the township population was 4,693.

Geography

Demographics

As of the census of 2000, there were 4,420 people, 1,616 households, and 1,258 families residing in the township.  The population density was 144.3 people per square mile (55.7/km2).  There were 1,681 housing units at an average density of 54.9/sq mi (21.2/km2).  The racial makeup of the township was 98.44% White, 0.43% African American, 0.14% Native American, 0.38% Asian, 0.34% from other races, and 0.27% from two or more races. Hispanic or Latino of any race were 1.70% of the population.

There were 1,616 households, out of which 36.6% had children under the age of 18 living with them, 65.6% were married couples living together, 6.7% had a female householder with no husband present, and 22.1% were non-families. 17.6% of all households were made up of individuals, and 7.4% had someone living alone who was 65 years of age or older.  The average household size was 2.74 and the average family size was 3.08.

In the township the population was spread out, with 26.8% under the age of 18, 7.6% from 18 to 24, 29.9% from 25 to 44, 23.9% from 45 to 64, and 11.8% who were 65 years of age or older.  The median age was 37 years. For every 100 females there were 100.6 males.  For every 100 females age 18 and over, there were 98.2 males.

The median income for a household in the township was $41,132, and the median income for a family was $44,619. Males had a median income of $30,313 versus $21,806 for females. The per capita income for the township was $16,913.  About 7.2% of families and 9.9% of the population were below the poverty line, including 17.2% of those under age 18 and 5.5% of those age 65 or over.

References

Populated places established in 1730
1730 establishments in Pennsylvania
Townships in Adams County, Pennsylvania
Townships in Pennsylvania